Suliasi Taufalele (born ) is a rugby union footballer born and playing in New Zealand. His regular playing position is hooker. He represents the Tonga national rugby union team. He has played in the Chiefs development side. He was also a member of the Counties Manukau Steelers side that won the championship in the 2012 ITM Cup, and he has been selected for the Steelers' squad for the 2013 ITM Cup season. He plays club rugby for Ardmore Marist.

References 

1988 births
New Zealand rugby union players
New Zealand sportspeople of Tongan descent
Counties Manukau rugby union players
Rugby union hookers
Rugby union players from Tokoroa
People educated at Saint Kentigern College
Living people
Tonga international rugby union players